The 1964 Dissolution Honours were officially announced on 27 November 1964 and marked the dissolution of parliament following the 1964 General Election.

The recipients of honours are displayed here as they were styled before their new honour.

Hereditary Peerages

Viscounts
 Rt Hon. The Lord Dilhorne, Conservative Member of Parliament for Daventry 1943–1950; and for South Northamptonshire, 1950–1962. Solicitor General for England and Wales, 1951–1954. Attorney General for England and Wales, 1954–1962. Lord Chancellor, 1962–1964. For political and public services.

Barons
 Rt Hon. Frederick James Erroll , Conservative Member of Parliament for Altrincham and Sale since 1945. Parliamentary Secretary, Ministry of Supply, 1955–1956; and to Board of Trade, 1956–1958; Economic Secretary to the Treasury, 1958–1959; Minister of State, Board of Trade, 1959–1961; President of the Board of Trade, 1961–1963; Minister of Power, 1963–1964. For political and public services.
 Sir Hugh Fraser , Chairman and Managing Director, House of Fraser Ltd. For political and public services.
 Sir Robert Villiers Grimston , Conservative Member of Parliament for Westbury, 1931–1964. Deputy Chairman of Ways and Means, 1962–1964. For political and public services.
 John Granville Morrison , Conservative Member of Parliament for Salisbury since 1942. Chairman, Conservative Members (1922) Committee, 1955–1964. For political and public services.
 Sir Robert Burnham Renwick , Partner in W. Greenwell and Co. For political and public services.
 Lieutenant-Colonel Michael Henry Colin Hughes-Young , Conservative Member of Parliament for Wandsworth Central, 1955–1964. A Lord Commissioner of the Treasury, 1958–1962 and Deputy Government Chief Whip, 1959–1964. Treasurer of the Household, 1962–1964. For political and public services.

Life Peerages
 Dame Barbara Muriel Brooke , Joint Vice-Chairman, Conservative Party Organisation, 1954–1964. For political and public services.
 The Honourable Evelyn Violet Elizabeth Emmett , Conservative Member of Parliament for East Grinstead since 1955. Chairman, National Union of Conservatives, 1955–1956. For political and public services.

Privy Counsellors
 Rt Hon. The Lord Chesham, Parliamentary Secretary to Ministry of Transport, 1959–1964.
 Edward Dillon Lott du Cann , Conservative Member of Parliament for Taunton since 1956. Economic Secretary to the Treasury, 1962–1963. Minister of State, Board of Trade, 1963–1964.
 Sir Kenneth William Murray Pickthorn , Conservative Member of Parliament for Cambridge University, 1935–1950; and for Carlton since 1950. Parliamentary Secretary, Ministry of Education, 1951–1954.

Baronetcies
 Graeme Bell Finlay , Conservative Member of Parliament for Epping, 1951–1964. A Lord Commissioner of the Treasury, 1959–1960; Vice-Chamberlain of the Household, 1960–1964. For political and public services.

Knights Bachelor
 Frederic Mackarness Bennett , Conservative Member of Parliament for Reading North, 1951–1955; and for Torquay since 1955. For political and public services.
 Wing Commander Eric Edward Bullus , Conservative Member of Parliament for Wembley North since 1950. For political and public services.
 Wing Commander Henry Algernon Langton . For political services in Devizes and Wessex.
 George Wilton Lee . For political and public services in Sheffield.
 Rupert Malise Speir , Conservative Member of Parliament for Hexham since 1951. For political and public services.

Order of the Companions of Honour
 Rt Hon. Henry Brooke , Conservative Member of Parliament for Lewisham West 1938–1945; and for Hampstead since 1950. Financial Secretary to the Treasury, 1954–1957; Minister of Housing and Local Government, and Minister for Welsh Affairs, 1957–1961; Chief Secretary to the Treasury and Paymaster-General, 1961–1962; Home Secretary 1962–1964. For political and public services.

Order of the British Empire

Dames Commander (DBE)
 Joan Helen Vickers , Conservative Member of Parliament for Plymouth Devonport since 1955. For political and public services.

Knights Commander (KBE)
 Rt Hon. David Lockhart-Mure Renton , National Liberal Member of Parliament for Huntingdonshire, 1945–1950; and National Liberal and Conservative Member for Huntingdon since 1950. Parliamentary Secretary to Ministry of Fuel and Power, 1955–1957; to Ministry of Power, 1957–1958; Joint Parliamentary Under Secretary of State, Home Office, 1958–1961; Minister of State, Home Office, 1961–1962. For political and public services.
 Rt Hon. The Earl St Aldwyn , Joint Parliamentary Secretary, Ministry of Agriculture, Fisheries and Food, 1954–1958. Captain of the Gentlemen-at-Arms and Government Chief Whip, House of Lords, 1958–1964. For political and public services.

Commanders (CBE)
 Reginald Thomas Glenny. For political services in Marylebone.
 George Hutchinson. For political services.
 Joan Florence Mary, Lady Newman. For political and public services in Hitchin.
 Rt Hon. The Lord Tweedsmuir , Chairman, Joint East and Central African Board 1950–1952. President, Commonwealth and British Empire Chambers of Commerce 1955–1957. A Governor of the Commonwealth Institute since 1958. President, Institute of Export since 1963. For political and public services.

Officers (OBE)
 Peter Reginald George Horton. For political services.
 Brendon Straker Sewill. For political services.

Members (MBE)
 Kathleen Mary Bryant. For political services.
 Alexander Douglas Eastwood. For political services in Kingston-upon-Hull.

See also
1964 Prime Minister's Resignation Honours

References

1964 in the United Kingdom
1964 awards
Dissolution Honours
1964 in British politics